The 1980–82 Galatama was the second season of Galatama which was held from 11 October 1980 to 13 March 1982.

Changes from 1979–80
The 1980–82 season saw five new clubs enter the league from PSSI's selection process, though one (BBSA Tama) withdrew midway through the previous season. The new clubs are:
 Angkasa
 UMS 80
 Mercu Buana
 Bintang Timur
 Makassar Utama

Teams
 Warna Agung (Jakarta)
 Jayakarta (Jakarta)
 Tunas Inti (Jakarta)
 UMS 80 (Jakarta)
 Arseto (Jakarta)
 Angkasa (Solo)
 Pardedetex (Medan)
 Mercu Buana (Medan)
 Jaka Utama (Lampung)
 NIAC Mitra (Surabaya)
 Indonesia Muda (Surabaya)
 Parkesa '78 (Sidoarjo)
 Cahaya Kita (Semarang)
 Bintang Timur (Jakarta)
 Sari Bumi Raya (Yogyakarta)
 Buana Putra (Bogor)
 Tidar Sakti (Magelang)
 Makassar Utama (Makassar)

Notes

League table

References

External links
list of Galatama champions

Indo
Galatama
Top level Indonesian football league seasons